Michael O'Connor (born 27 October 1965) is an English costume designer.

Life and career
O'Connor was born in London, England. He began his training in theatre, as a dresser at the Old Vic in London. After this, he worked in a costume house for six years before deciding to go freelance.

In 1993, he began work as a wardrobe supervisor on such films as The House of the Spirits and Emma, before becoming an assistant costume designer. In this role, he worked on various films, including Oscar and Lucinda, Quills, Proof of Life and was also associate costume designer on the film version of Harry Potter and the Chamber of Secrets.

After working as costume designer on several minor British films, he came to prominence with his work on Tom Brown's Schooldays, a TV movie for ITV. He then worked on his most high-profile film up until then, the film version of Giles Foden's bestselling novel, The Last King of Scotland. He then worked on Brick Lane as well as Miss Pettigrew Lives for a Day.

He came to the attention of the film industry in 2009, when he received the Academy Award for Best Costume Design, the BAFTA Award for Best Costume Design as well as the Satellite Award for Best Costume Design for The Duchess.

In 2014, he started working on costumes for Tulip Fever.

In 2021, he was nominated for another BAFTA Award for Best Costume Design for his work on Ammonite.

Filmography

Awards and nominations

References

External links
 

1965 births
Living people
Artists from London
English costume designers
Best Costume Design Academy Award winners
Best Costume Design BAFTA Award winners